Charles Berthézenne (30 January 1871 in Valleraugue – 11 June 1942) was a French politician. He represented the Republican-Socialist Party (from 1928 to 1935) and the Socialist Republican Union (from 1935 to 1940) in the Chamber of Deputies. On 10 July 1940, he voted in favour of granting the cabinet led by Marshal Philippe Pétain authority to draw up a new constitution, thereby effectively ending the French Third Republic and establishing Vichy France.

References

1871 births
1942 deaths
People from Gard
Politicians from Occitania (administrative region)
Republican-Socialist Party politicians
Socialist Republican Union politicians
Members of the 14th Chamber of Deputies of the French Third Republic
Members of the 15th Chamber of Deputies of the French Third Republic
Members of the 16th Chamber of Deputies of the French Third Republic